Jean-Paul Meyer (born 1 January 1950) is a French former professional tennis player.

Meyer, runner-up at the French juniors in 1968, was active on tour through to the mid-1970s. He reached the round of 16 at the 1972 Australian Open, where he was beaten by eventual champion Ken Rosewall.

References

External links
 
 

1950 births
Living people
French male tennis players